Pseudochalcura gibbosa is a species of chalcid wasp in the family Eucharitidae. It is associated with ants from the Camponotus genus.

References

Further reading

External links

 

Parasitic wasps
Insects described in 1881
Chalcidoidea
Hymenoptera of North America